Hinikissia Albertine Ndikert (born 15 September 1992) is a track and field sprint athlete who competes internationally for Chad.

Ndikert represented Chad at the 2008 Summer Olympics in Beijing. She competed at the 100 metres sprint and placed seventh in her heat without advancing to the second round. She ran the distance in a time of 12.55 seconds.

References

External links

1992 births
Living people
Chadian female sprinters
Olympic athletes of Chad
Athletes (track and field) at the 2008 Summer Olympics
Athletes (track and field) at the 2012 Summer Olympics
World Athletics Championships athletes for Chad
Olympic female sprinters